Siegendorf is a town in the district of Eisenstadt-Umgebung in the Austrian state of Burgenland.

History 
During World War II, a forced labor camp staffed by Hungarian Arrow Cross guards forced Jewish men from northern Transylvania located in Hungarian-occupied Romania, was located in Siegendorf. Nearly all of the inmates were executed by the Hungarian guards as the Soviet liberation forces were approaching when the guards pretended to want to march the Jewish inmates to an unknown location. Very few prisoners survived. Almost none of them documented their experience at this camp except one former inmate who incorrectly claims to be the "sole" survivor. Bear in mind, many survivors were not articulate and did not care to memorialize this experience in writing. But they have passed their experience along via their children and/or grandchildren. The Jewish slaves at the Siegendorf Camp were enslaved in a local gold mine.

Population

References

Cities and towns in Eisenstadt-Umgebung District
Nazi concentration camps in Austria
Jewish Austrian history
Jewish Hungarian history
Holocaust locations in Austria